Janapriya Multiple Campus (JMC) is a multi-disciplinary institute affiliated to the Tribhuwan University and located in Pokhara, Nepal. The campus was established in 1991 as a non-profit academic institution to develop skilled human resources.  The campus has been QAA certified by the University Grants Commission (Nepal). As of 2019, the campus has 4550 students. The campus has an arrangement with a local bank to provide employment to a few students with highest scores. The campus publishes its own academic journal annually titled Janapriya Journal of Interdisciplinary Studies.

History
On 8 March 2005, students of the All Nepal National Independent Students' Union (Revolutionary) assaulted the principal of the college, Ganesh Man Palikhe, in his office, dousing him with gasoline and attempting to burn him alive. He fought back and survived. The district administration arranged two police officers as bodyguards, but on 12 June he and his bodyguards were assassinated by Maoist gunmen.

On 14 December 2008, students affiliated with communist parties CPN-Maoist and CPN-UML forcibly detained Campus Chief Sabita Baidya and vandalized her office, burning furniture and documents. She resigned after the attack.

Courses 
 Master of Business Administration (MBA)
 Master of Business Studies (MBS)
 BSc in Microbiology
 Bachelor of Mountain Tourism Management (BMTM)
 BBA (Bachelor of Business Administration (BBA)
 BIM sexual
 Bachelor of Business studies (BBS)
 Bachelor of Arts (BA)
 Bachelor of Education (B Ed)
 10+2 in Management, Education, Humanities and Science.
Academics Programs
10+2 Programs
(HSEB Affiliated)
Management
Education
Humanities
Science
Bachelor's Programs
(TU Affiliated)
BSc
BBA
BMTM
BIM
BBS
BA
B Ed
Master's Programs
(TU Affiliated)
MBS
MBA in Hospitality Management

See also
Prithivi Narayan Campus

References

External links
official website
Campus Journal
QAA certified institutes in Nepal

Tribhuvan University
Education in Pokhara
1991 establishments in Nepal